Warner or Garnier (fl. 1106), was an English writer of homilies, and a monk of Westminster.

He was present at the translation of the relics of St. Withburga, 1106. He is called 'homeliarius,' and dedicated a volume of homilies to his abbot, Gilbert Crispin. This work is lost. His writings have sometimes been confused with those of the celebrated Werner Rolewinck, who wrote in the fourteenth century.

References

Year of birth unknown
Year of death unknown
12th-century deaths
12th-century English people
12th-century Roman Catholics
12th-century English writers
English Christian monks
English religious writers
12th-century Latin writers